USS Pawnee (YT-21) was a yard tug in the United States Navy.

Pawnee was built in 1896 by Rodermund & Co. at Tomkins Cove, New York, as the steam lighter John Dwight. The U.S. Navy purchased her on 6 May 1898 from George T. Moon and commissioned her the same day as USS Pawnee.

Pawnee was assigned to the 3rd Naval District and operated as a harbor tug at the New York Navy Yard in Brooklyn, New York, throughout her career.

Pawnee decommissioned on 24 March 1922. She was sold on 25 July 1922 to Seabury & DeZafra, Inc., of New York City.

References

External links
 Photo gallery at navsource.org

 

Tugs of the United States Navy
Ships built in New York (state)
1896 ships
Maritime incidents in 1910